In number theory, the Kronecker symbol, written as  or , is a generalization of the Jacobi symbol to all integers .

Definition
Let  be a non-zero integer, with prime factorization  

Let  be an integer. The Kronecker symbol  is defined by 

For odd , the number  is simply the usual Legendre symbol. This leaves the case when . We define  by 

Since it extends the Jacobi symbol, the quantity  is simply  when . When , we define it by

Finally, we put

These extensions suffice to define the Kronecker symbol for all integer values .

Table of values

The following is a table of values of Kronecker symbol  with 1 ≤ n, k ≤ 30.

Properties
The Kronecker symbol shares many basic properties of the Jacobi symbol, under certain restrictions:
 if , otherwise .

On the other hand, the Kronecker symbol does not have the same connection to quadratic residues as the Jacobi symbol. In particular, the Kronecker symbol  for even  can take values independently on whether  is a quadratic residue or nonresidue modulo .

Quadratic reciprocity 
The Kronecker symbol also satisfies the following versions of quadratic reciprocity law. 

Then the following symmetric version of quadratic reciprocity holds for every pair of integers  such that :

 
 

There is also equivalent non-symmetric version of quadratic reciprocity that holds for every pair of relatively prime integers :

 

For any integer  let . Then we have another equivalent non-symmetric version that states

 

for every pair of integers  (not necessarily relatively prime).

The supplementary laws generalize to the Kronecker symbol as well. These laws follow easily from each version of quadratic reciprocity law stated above (unlike with Legendre and Jacobi symbol where both the main law and the supplementary laws are needed to fully describe the quadratic reciprocity).

For any integer  we have
 
and for any odd integer  it's

Connection to Dirichlet characters

In particular, primitive real Dirichlet characters  are in a 1–1 correspondence with quadratic fields , where  is a nonzero square-free integer (we can include the case  to represent the principal character, even though it is not a quadratic field). The character  can be recovered from the field as the Artin symbol : that is, for a positive prime , the value of  depends on the behaviour of the ideal  in  the ring of integers :

Then  equals the Kronecker symbol , where

By the law of quadratic reciprocity, we have . A character  can be represented as  if and only if its odd part , in which case we can take .

See also
 Hilbert symbol

References

 

Modular arithmetic